George C. Marshall (1880–1959) was an American soldier and statesman. General Marshall may also refer to:

Francis Marshall (U.S. Army officer) (1867–1922), U.S. Army general
Francis Marshall (British Army officer) (1876–1942), British Army major general
Frederick Marshall (British Army officer) (1829–1900), British Army lieutenant general
George Frederick Leycester Marshall (1843–1934), British Indian Army major general
Humphrey Marshall (general) (1812–1872), Confederate States Army brigadier general
James C. Marshall (1897–1977), U.S. Army Corps of Engineers brigadier general
Richard Marshall (general) (1895–1973), U.S. Army major general
S.L.A. Marshall (1900–1977), U.S. Army brigadier general 
St. Julien R. Marshall (1904–1989), U.S. Marine Corps brigadier general
Thomas Marshall (general) (1793–1853), U.S. Army brigadier general
William Marshall (British Army officer) (1865–1939), British Army lieutenant general
William Louis Marshall (1846–1920), U.S. Army brigadier general
Winton W. Marshall (1919–2015), U.S. Air Force lieutenant general

See also
James Marshall-Cornwall (1887–1985), British Army general
Attorney General Marshall (disambiguation)